Evolution Studios Ltd. was a British video game developer based in Runcorn, Cheshire. The company was founded in 1999 by Martin Kenwright and Ian Hetherington, following the purchase of their studio Digital Image Design's publisher Ocean Software by Infogrames. Kenwright then left Digital Image Design with six members of staff to form Evolution Studios.

Company history
Then based in Frodsham, Cheshire, it developed a racing demo on PC, depicting multiple rally cars racing on a circuit with cockpit views, which was subsequently picked up by Sony as it was interested in a PlayStation 2 game based on the World Rally Championship licence.

Both Evolution and their satellite studio, Bigbig Studios, in Warwickshire were acquired by Sony Computer Entertainment in September 2007. At this point, Kenwright and Hetherington left the company, with its co-founder Mick Hocking taking over, running Evolution, Bigbig and Studio Liverpool as Group Studio Director. Hocking was subsequently promoted to Vice President of the Studio Group in April 2011.

The developer's last game was Driveclub. It was scheduled as a PlayStation 4 launch title, although it was ultimately delayed, until October 2014. They claim they had trademarked the name of the game almost 10 years ago, but were waiting for the technology to create their vision of the game.

On 23 March 2015, 55 staff members were cut from Evolution Studio, which sources say is approximately half the studio. The redundancies have been described by Sony as a way to focus the studio on developing Driveclub as a service. On 22 March 2016, Sony announced that Evolution Studios was closed.

On 11 April 2016, the development team joined Codemasters as Codemasters EVO, which would be renamed as Codemasters Cheshire. After the disappointing sales of their next game Onrush, several members of the Codemasters Cheshire development division were let go in redundancies, including game director Paul Rustchynsky and the division was shifted to a support role for other Codemasters titles. In May 2022, the team at Codemasters Cheshire was merged into Criterion Games, an EA subsidiary.

Games developed

References

External links
 

Defunct video game companies of the United Kingdom
Video game companies established in 1999
Video game companies disestablished in 2016
1999 establishments in England
2016 disestablishments in England
PlayStation Studios
2007 mergers and acquisitions
Video game development companies
Defunct companies of England
Runcorn